beObank, nv/SA/AG is a Belgian bank owned by a French financial conglomerate Crédit Mutuel Nord Europe.

As of 2013, the company offers everyday banking products (current accounts, loans, credit cards, etc.) through the network of 192 branches across Belgium.

History
City Bank of New York was opened in Brussels in 1919 and continued its operations  until World War II.
In 1962, Citibank reopened its banking facilities in Brussels. In 1969, Citibank took over Crédivit Bank and Financia Bank. Crédivit merged with Financia to form Famibank in 1977. After having taken over Banque Copine and Banque Sud Belge, Banque Sud Belge merged with Famibank, creating Citibank Belgium in 1992. In 2012 the Citibank consumer franchise was sold to Credit Mutuel Nord Europe. In March 2013, Citibank Belgium was rebranded to Beobank NV/SA. In May 2015, the Crédit Mutuel Nord Europe group's BKCP bank disappeared in favor of the Beobank brand.

External links

 Beobank.be Home page
 Annual report 2012 English version
 Annual report 2012 French version

Banks of Belgium
Crédit Mutuel